Transfer is an unincorporated community in Mercer County, Pennsylvania, United States. Transfer has a post office, with ZIP code 16154. Norfolk Southern Railway's Meadville Line passes through the community that is also bisected by Rutledge Road and Brush Run.

Events 
There is an annual event called Transfer Harvest Home Fair. This fair has been held since 1877, and  had its 140th annual event in 2017.

http://www.transferfair.com

References

Unincorporated communities in Mercer County, Pennsylvania
Unincorporated communities in Pennsylvania